Napoléon Louis Davout d'Auerstaedt d'Eckmühl, 2nd Duc d'Auerstaedt, 2nd and last Prince d'Eckmühl ( 6 January 1811 – 13 June 1853), was a French nobleman. Born in Paris, he was  the son of Louis Nicolas Davout, Marshal of France. Davout inherited the title Duke of Auerstaedt upon his father's death in 1823. The title became extinct in 1853.

Davout was also Mayor of Savigny-sur-Orge from 1843 to 1846. He died unmarried and without issue.

1811 births
1853 deaths
Nobility from Paris
Dukes of Auerstaedt